Wolf is a 2021 psychological drama film written and directed by Nathalie Biancheri. An international co-production of Ireland and Poland, it stars George MacKay, Lily-Rose Depp, Paddy Considine, Eileen Walsh, Fionn O'Shea and Lola Petticrew.

Wolf had its world premiere at the 2021 Toronto International Film Festival on September 17, 2021. It had a limited theatre release in the United States on December 3, 2021 by Focus Features. The film received mixed to negative reviews from critics, who praised the performances of Mackay, Depp, and Considine, but Biancheri's script and direction were unanimously criticized.

Plot
A boy named Jacob who suffers from zoanthropy, believing he is a wolf, is committed to a mental asylum following an attack on his brother. There he meets and befriends the other patients, who also believe themselves to be animals, including Rufus, who believes he’s a German Shepherd. He forms a close bond with Cecile, an enigmatic patient nicknamed "Wildcat", and together they roam the hallways at night. After witnessing the brutal methods of treatment performed by the head of the asylum, Dr. Mann, the Zookeeper, Jacob becomes frustrated and attacks an orderly, resulting in him being caged and gagged. Cecile sneaks into the room where he is caged one night and makes love to him, but they are caught by Dr Angeli and Jacob is punished with a cattle prod, causing the other patients to lash out at the Zookeeper. Disgusted by Zookeeper and Angeli, Cecile frees Jacob from his cage, allowing him to escape into the forest where he can live in freedom as a wolf.

Cast
 George MacKay as Jacob (Wolf)
 Lily-Rose Depp as Cecile (Wildcat)
 Paddy Considine as Dr. Mann (Zookeeper)
 Eileen Walsh as Dr Angeli
 Fionn O'Shea as Rufus (German Shepherd)
 Lola Petticrew as Judith (Parrot)
 Senan Jennings as Duck

Production
In February 2020, it was announced George MacKay and Lily-Rose Depp had joined the cast of the film, with Nathalie Biancheri directing from a screenplay she wrote. In September 2020, Paddy Considine, Eileen Walsh, Fionn O'Shea, Lola Petticrew and Senan Jennings joined the cast of the film.

Principal photography began in August 2020. Production was initially set to begin in April 2020, but was delayed due to the COVID-19 pandemic. Principal photography ended by October 2020.

Release
Focus Features acquired distribution rights to the film in October 2020. The film had a theatrical release in the U.S. on 3 December 2021, after premiering at the Toronto International Film Festival on 17 September 2021 as the entry for Ireland.

Reception

Box office
In the United States and Canada, the film earned $82,640 from 308 theaters in its opening weekend and $15,160 in its second before ending its theatrical run.

Critical response
 On Metacritic, which uses a weighted average, the film has a score of 52 based on 15 reviews, indicating "mixed or average reviews".

References

External links
 
 
 

2020s psychological drama films
Irish drama films
Polish drama films
English-language Irish films
English-language Polish films
Film productions suspended due to the COVID-19 pandemic
Films impacted by the COVID-19 pandemic
Focus Features films
2021 independent films
2020s English-language films